Jean Kennedy McFarlane, Baroness McFarlane of Llandaff, FRCN, MCSP (1 April 1926 – 13 May 2012), was a British nurse and member of the House of Lords.

Biography
McFarlane was born in Cardiff, Wales, and later trained as a nurse, a midwife, and as a health visitor before going on to pursue a successful career in nursing teaching and administration. She studied sociology at Bedford College, London. In the 1960s she participated in the Royal College of Nursing research programme "Study of Nursing Care". In 1974 she became the holder of the first Chair of Nursing at an English university (the University of Manchester) and held it until 1989.

McFarlane served on the Royal Commission on the National Health Service, 1976–79 (Chairman: Sir Alec Merrison).

A committed Christian, she served as a member of the general synod of the Church of England 1990–1994.

House of Lords
McFarlane was created a life peer in the House of Lords as Baroness McFarlane of Llandaff, of Llandaff in the County of South Glamorgan on 30 July 1979, in the Queen's Birthday Honours list.

McFarlane was a member of four select committees of the House of Lords. As well as being a Vice President of the League of Nurses of St Bartholomew's Hospital.  In 1976 she was made a Fellow of the Royal College of Nursing. She was a trustee of numerous charities. In 2005, she was awarded the British Journal of Nursing's Lifetime Achievement Award.

Legacy
In 2009, a new building of the University of Manchester was named the Jean McFarlane Building. It is situated to the east of University Place and is one of many completed in recent years.

Publications
Baroness McFarlane was the author of a number of studies, notably A Guide to the Practice of Nursing Using the Nursing Process, 1982.

References

1926 births
2012 deaths
People from Cardiff
Academics of the University of Manchester
Welsh nurses
British non-fiction writers
Crossbench life peers
Life peeresses created by Elizabeth II
People educated at Howell's School Llandaff
Fellows of the Royal College of Nursing
Place of death missing
British nurses